Gibson v. United States, 329 U.S. 338 (1946), was a case in which the Supreme Court of the United States ruled that a Jehovah's Witness minister could appeal his classification without first appearing at induction camp.

References

External links
 

1946 in United States case law
United States Supreme Court cases
United States Supreme Court cases of the Vinson Court
Jehovah's Witnesses litigation in the United States
1946 in religion
Christianity and law in the 20th century